Volgorechensk is a town in Kostroma Oblast, Russia, on the right bank of the Volga River,  south of Kostroma, the administrative center of the oblast. Population:

History
The town was founded in 1964 as a settlement for the employees of the Kostroma Power Station.  It was granted town status in 1994, and in 2005 the status of a city district.

Administrative and municipal status
Within the framework of administrative divisions, it is, together with two rural localities, incorporated as the town of oblast significance of Volgorechensk—an administrative unit with the status equal to that of the districts. As a municipal division, the town of oblast significance of Volgorechensk is incorporated as Volgorechensk Urban Okrug.

References

Notes

Sources

External links
 Official website of Volgorechensk
 Unofficial website of Volgorechensk
 Volgorechensk in VK

Populated places on the Volga
Cities and towns in Kostroma Oblast